Mark Burg is an American film producer, manager and actor. He is the co-founder of Evolution Entertainment and produced the Saw film series as well as the CBS television series Two and a Half Men.

Biography

Burg graduated from the Roy H. Park School of Communications at Ithaca College in 1981. 
 
In the 1990s, Burg worked for Island Pictures and Palm Pictures, producing such films as Basketball Diaries (1995), The Sandlot, The Cure, and Strictly Business (1991). In 1998, Burg founded Evolution Entertainment along with his producing partner Oren Koules. 

In 2003, Burg and Oren Koules saw a seven-minute teaser of a film written by Australian screenwriters, Leigh Whannell and James Wan, and agreed to produce the film. The film would later become the original Saw film that was
released in 2004. The budget for the film was $1.2 million with $1 million of the funding coming direct from Burg and Koules. Production was done under a newly formed subsidiary of Evolution Entertainment called Twisted Pictures. The film turned in the Saw franchise with the sequel released in 2005 and the franchise making $420 million at the box office by 2007. Evolution Entertainment was also responsible for the production of Two and a Half Men starting in 2003.

Burg became the sole-owner of Evolution Entertainment in 2011, buying out co-founder Oren Koules. He also became an advisor for Forest Road, a special-purpose acquisition company, in 2020. Burg also co-produced Spiral, the ninth installment from the Saw Franchise.

He has received a ShoWest Awards, People's Choice Awards, and has been nominated for four Emmy Awards.

Filmography
He was a producer in all films unless otherwise noted.

Film

As an actor

Miscellaneous crew

Thanks

Television

References

External links
 

Living people
American male television actors
Television producers from New York (state)
People from Hartsdale, New York
Year of birth missing (living people)